Pallamkuzhi is a 1983 Indian Malayalam-language film, directed and produced by M. N. Sreedharan. The film stars Roopa, V. Sambasivan and Alummoodan. The film has musical score by K. Raghavan and V. Sambasivan.

Plot
Hemachandran, a writer, narrates his life journey at a felicitation event and recounts how the death of his role model, Yetheendran, changed his life forever.

Cast
Roopa as Devu
V. Sambasivan as Hemachandran
N.G Rajendra Das as Yatheendran
Alummoodan as Madhavan
Jagannatha Varma as Karthavu
Nellikode Bhaskaran as Raman Nair
Philomina
S. P. Pillai

Soundtrack
The music was composed by K. Raghavan and V. Sambasivan with lyrics by V. Sambasivan and Ettumanoor Sreekumar.

References

External links
 

1983 films
1980s Malayalam-language films